Emil Hermann (1888 - 1968) was a prominent dealer and restorer of violins in New York City. Nearly all of the most famous instruments passed through his hands at one time or another in his career, including literally hundreds made by Antonio Stradivari, Jacob Stainer,  and the Amati and Guarneri families. He taught and employed later influential figures in the violin trade such as Simone Sacconi and Hans Weisshaar.

External links
 Cozio violin archive

Bowed string instrument makers
1888 births
1968 deaths